Smoke pot may refer to:

To smoke pot refers to cannabis smoking
A smoke pot refers to a smoke signal device, usually a canister

See also 
 Smoke grenade